Pabstiella arcuata is a species of orchid plant native to Brazil.

References 

arcuata
Flora of Brazil
Plants described in 1859